Dayane de Fátima da Rocha (born 13 May 1985), commonly known as Dayane Rocha or simply as Dayane, is a Brazilian football and futsal striker, who has played for professional clubs in Brazil, France, Spain and Italy. She previously played for Irex Puebla and Sporting Huelva in Spain's Superliga.

She received a late call-up to the Brazil national team panel during the 2004 Summer Olympics, as an injury replacement for Kelly who had broken her collarbone.

She transferred to Bardolino Verona in August 2009. In March 2011 Dayane obtained Italian citizenship, allowing her to be treated as a domestic player in Serie A with Bardolino Verona.

Dayane returned to Brazil in 2010 to finish her college scholarship. She intended to resume playing for Novo Mundo but was dismayed to find they had recently disbanded. Instead she played for Kindermann in the 2010 Copa do Brasil. She returned to Kindermann's ranks in 2013.

Throughout her outdoor football career she also enjoyed playing futsal, and decided to focus exclusively on the latter in 2013. She remained in Italy and played successfully for a series of Italian futsal clubs, including Isolotto, Olimpus Roma, Montesilvano, Cagliari, and Granzette (which changed its name to Rovigo Orange in 2022).

References

External links
 
 Profile at Footoféminin 

1985 births
Living people
Brazilian women's footballers
Footballers at the 2004 Summer Olympics
Olympic footballers of Brazil
Olympic silver medalists for Brazil
Olympic medalists in football
Expatriate women's footballers in France
Expatriate women's footballers in Italy
Expatriate women's footballers in Spain
Medalists at the 2004 Summer Olympics
Primera División (women) players
Serie A (women's football) players
Olympique Lyonnais Féminin players
Sporting de Huelva players
A.S.D. AGSM Verona F.C. players
Brazil women's international footballers
Brazilian expatriate women's footballers
Brazilian expatriate sportspeople in Spain
Division 1 Féminine players
Women's association football forwards
Footballers from Curitiba
Sociedade Esportiva Kindermann players